"Chrome" is a song by the American vocalist Debbie Harry, featured on her debut album KooKoo in 1981. The song was issued as an advance 12" promo in the United States with the album track "Under Arrest" as the B-side but it never had a commercial release. A 7" single was, however, released in Germany, (the B-side was "The Jam Was Moving", which was an A-side in the United Kingdom and the United States), though this failed to chart.

Track listing
US 12" Promo
"Chrome" (Deborah Harry, Chris Stein) - 4:16  
"Under Arrest" (Bernard Edwards, Deborah Harry, Nile Rodgers, Chris Stein)- 2:56 
7" Germany
"Chrome" (Deborah Harry, Chris Stein) - 4:16  
"The Jam Was Moving" (Bernard Edwards, Nile Rodgers) - 2:58

1981 singles
Debbie Harry songs
Songs written by Chris Stein
Songs written by Debbie Harry
Song recordings produced by Nile Rodgers
Song recordings produced by Bernard Edwards
1981 songs
Chrysalis Records singles